Aileen Haydee Bernal Ardines, (born 19 August 1994), (La Villa de Los Santos) Los Santos is a Panamanian model and beauty pageant contestant winner of the Miss International Panamá 2014 title on July 13, 2014, for Miss International 2014 contest.

Miss Panamá 2014

Bernal is 5 ft 11 in (1.81 m) tall, and competed in the national beauty pageant Miss Panamá 2014. She represented the state of Los Santos.

Miss International 2014

She represented Panamá in the 2014 Miss International pageant, held on November 11, 2014, in Tokyo, Japan, where she place in the top 10.

See also
 Miss Panamá 2014
 María Gallimore

References

External links
Panamá 2014 official website
Miss Panamá
Miss Panamá blogspot

1994 births
Living people
Panamanian beauty pageant winners
Miss International 2014 delegates
Panamanian female models
Señorita Panamá